The first season of Junior MasterChef Thailand,  began on 8 February 2013 and aired on CH3. Patiparn Pataweekarn, Ban Boribun, and Chatchaya Ruktakanit are the judges.

Changes
In contrast to prior series, Junior MasterChef Thailand is produced by Shine Limited. The series premiered on Sunday, 4 February 2013. It also as three judge during individual challenges.

The series began with the Top 50 selected from the 5,500 applicants who auditioned for the show. The Top 50 featured five heats, with ten from the Top 50 who were best at the heat's team participating in each heat. Afterwards, the judges selected four to move forward to the Top 20. Furthermore, the Top 20 competed in two challenges to pick the Top 20. Contrast to other versions, contestants are not eliminated every week; rather, four are eliminated at every stage of the competition. Every eliminated contestant received a range of prizes, including those in the Top 50.

Contestants 
The top 10 contestants were chosen throughout the first week of challenges amongst the Top 50 and the Top 20. The full group of 10 were all revealed on:

MasterChef Thailand
2013 Thai television seasons